The Battle of Guanzhong occurred during the Taiping Revolution that took place in October 1861. When Taiping's Western Army was defeated at Wuhan, they lost their connection with their capital of Nanjing. Former Western Army Commander Chen Yucheng then decided to resupply at Guanzhong. Some of their soldiers were troops who once fought for the Nian Rebellion, so Yucheng decided not to provide them with supplies, as he was uncertain of their loyalty.

Background 
On August 22 the Xianfeng Emperor of the Qing Dynasty died at age 30. Gen. Guan Wen ordered the stationary Green Standard Army, consisting of 500,000 men, to move to Eastern Henan to guard the capital at Beijing.

However, the campaign began to look like an ambush to Chen. His uncle Chen Decai did not obey Chen's orders. In November Chen Decai directed an offensive in southern and western Henan that he easily won. The attack created a long front for the Taiping Western Army. At the time Chen Yucheng commanded only the remaining 50,000 of the Taiping Western Army and guarded its tail, but was surrounded by the 150,000-strong Qing army in Hefei.

When Chen Decai discovered it had been a trick he went back to save Chen Yucheng, but was too late. Chen Yucheng and his entire force were destroyed in May 1862.

Battle of Anqing 
The Battle of Anqing was intense and ended on September 5. Its loss cost the Western Army 90,000 men and severely affected their morale.

Chen Yucheng believed that they could recover Anqing in a short time, but his generals disagreed.

Death of Hu Linyi
News of the death of the Xianfeng Emperor encouraged the Governor of Hubei, Hu Linyi, to attempt the recovery of Anqing for Qing. However, he died on September 30. This was good news for Chen Yucheng, because Hu Linyi was the most formidable of his enemies.

Fatigue 
An important factor in the actions of the Western Army was their own fatigue after so many years of fighting. A series of defeats damaged troop morale, and so an escape from the fighting was desired. However, the supply of soldiers and food could have just been an excuse by Chen Yucheng.

Taiping's third and last western offensive 

The Taiping army had been raised three times in large-scale western offensives. The first was in Hunan and Hubei in 1853, led by Qin Rigang, Shi Dakai and Lai Hanying, with an army of over 300,000. The second offensive took place in  Wuhan in 1855, led by Wei Jun, Chen Yucheng and Yang Fuqing; this offensive was the largest, with over 700,000 troops. The final was the Battle of Guanzhong in 1861.

References 

Guanzhong
Shaanxi 1861
Guanzhong
Military history of Shaanxi
Green Standard Army
October 1861 events
November 1861 events
December 1861 events
January 1862 events
February 1862 events
March 1862 events
April 1862 events
May 1862 events
June 1862 events
July 1862 events
August 1862 events
September 1862 events
October 1862 events
November 1862 events
December 1862 events
January 1863 events
February 1863 events
March 1863 events
April 1863 events
May 1863 events
June 1863 events
July 1863 events
August 1863 events
September 1863 events
October 1863 events
November 1863 events
December 1863 events
January 1864 events
February 1864 events